Plagiotremus spilistius is a species of combtooth blenny found in the eastern Pacific ocean.  This species reaches a length of  SL. It is the type species of the genus Plagiotremus.

References

spilistius
Fish described in 1865